Andrew Martin Steane is Professor of physics at the University of Oxford. He is also a fellow of Exeter College, Oxford.

He was a student at St Edmund Hall, Oxford where he obtained his MA and DPhil.

His major works to date are on error correction in quantum information processing, including Steane codes. He was awarded the Maxwell Medal and Prize of the Institute of Physics in 2000.

Papers
 "Quantum Computing" Reports on Progress in Physics 61: 117–173. Steane, A.M. (1998)
 "A Quantum Computer Needs Only One Universe" Studies in History and Philosophy of Modern Physics 34B: 469–478, Steane, A.M. (2003)

Books

'Relativity Made Relatively Easy' is a text that follows closely to the 'Symmetry and Relativity' course that he teaches to third-year undergraduates at the University of Oxford. Except for Spinors, which is intended to be included in his next publication.

''Thermodynamics by Andrew Steane

References

External links
Homepage

Living people
British physicists
Fellows of Exeter College, Oxford
Alumni of St Edmund Hall, Oxford
Quantum information scientists
1965 births